The 1995 Northeast Louisiana Indians football team represented Northeast Louisiana University in the 1995 NCAA Division I-A college football season. The Indians offense scored 233 points while the defense allowed 413 points.

Schedule

References

Northeast Louisiana
Louisiana–Monroe Warhawks football seasons
Northeast Louisiana Indians football